Monticuliporidae is a family of bryozoans belonging to the order Trepostomata, characterized by branching, encrusting, or massive colonies with regularly spaced bumps on their surfaces. It is one of the earliest bryozoan families to arise, known from the early Ordovician period, but disappears from the fossil record after the late Silurian period. Monticuliporidae had a widespread geographical range and many genera had cosmopolitan distribution.

Genera
Homotrypa
 Mesotrypa
Monticulipora
Prasopora

References

Bryozoan families
Prehistoric bryozoans
Trepostomata